Samson Fox (11 July 1838 – 24 October 1903) was an English engineer, industrialist and philanthropist. He was elected Mayor of Harrogate in Yorkshire and the building of the Royal College of Music in London was funded largely by Fox.

Life and career

Samson Fox was born at Bowling, Bradford, Yorkshire, England, the son of Jonas Fox, a mill worker, by his marriage to Sarah Pearson, and the family shortly afterwards moved to live and work in nearby Leeds. At the age of eight Fox started work in a textile mill and at fifteen he became an apprentice in a toolmaking and foundry company. In his late twenties, he was running his own toolmaking business, called the Silver Cross Works.

Ten years later, in 1874, he set up the Leeds Forge Company to produce "Best Yorkshire" iron for locomotive and marine engine parts. In 1877 he developed the corrugated boiler flue for which he became famous. This simple idea involved corrugating the flue pipes inside the boiler, improving both their heat transfer capability and compressive strength, enabling smaller boilers working at higher pressures to be used with improved safety. "Fox Corrugated" was adopted as standard by the Admiralty and major steamship lines and was widely patented.

In 1887, Fox applied his knowledge and experience in forging metal to building forged pressed iron railway undercarriages and trucks. His railway trucks could support 120 tons without failing, were guaranteed for five years, and were soon being sold in Argentina, Belgium, British India, Japan, and Spain, in addition to England. North America however was the world's biggest market, so in 1888 Fox went to the United States, where he made a deal with the famous railway salesman Diamond Jim Brady for Brady to sell American-made Fox trucks in America and to remit one third of the sale price back to Fox as commission. Brady's sales techniques soon succeeded, and in 1888 the Fox Solid Pressed Steel Company was incorporated to manufacture the trucks in Joliet, Illinois.

Fox won a number of awards for his work, including the Royal Society of Arts gold medal for his corrugated boiler flue and the French Legion of Honour.

Fox bought and extended Grove House in Harrogate, a Yorkshire spa town, and became a benefactor to the local community. He provided Harrogate with its first steam fire engine, built the Grove Road School opposite his home, funded the Royal Hall, and provided affordable social housing. He also built a water gas plant to provide the main street of Harrogate with some of the earliest street lighting. Eventually he became Mayor of Harrogate for three successive years (1890–92), a record never equalled since. He was a JP (Justice of the Peace) for both Leeds and Harrogate.

Around 1890, he invited the Croatian artist Vlaho Bukovac to stay at Grove House and paint a series of family portraits. He collected many of Bukovac's other paintings but the collection was dispersed in an auction in 1911. The most important of all his purchases was the huge 'Suffer the Little Children', shown at the Paris Salon in 1888, which the Fox family later presented to St. Robert's church in Harrogate.

In 1892-1894 he provided most of the funds (£45,000, in two donations) to build the Royal College of Music in London, and a bust of him has a prominent place in the entrance hall.

He died in Walsall, Staffordshire, in 1903. The King sent Harrogate a telegram of condolence.

He had married Mary Anne Slinger in Leeds in 1861. They had four children. At the 1889 wedding of his eldest daughter Clara Louisa to engineer Bernal Bagshawe, Dan Leno was paid the then unheard of sum of £100 to entertain the guests and the grounds of Grove House were thrown open to the people of Harrogate. After the death of his first wife in 1895, he remarried in 1899, to Annie Louise Baxter.

In 1891 Samson Fox was granted Arms by the College of Arms, London:

Arms: Argent a representation of a corrugated boiler-flue fesseways proper between two foxes courant Gules each holding in their mouth a trefoil slipped Vert.

Crest: A representation of a corrugated boiler-flue as in the Arms and thereupon a fox Gules resting the dexter paw upon a trefoil slipped Vert.

Motto: Forti Nihil Difficile. (To the brave, nothing is difficult.)

Family
His son, Arthur William Fox, married Hilda Hanbury, sister of actress Lily Hanbury. His grandson Robin Fox was the head of the Fox acting dynasty, making Samson Fox great-grandfather to screen actors Edward Fox OBE, James Fox OBE, and film and theatre producer Robert Fox, great-great-grandfather to English actresses Emilia Fox, Lydia Fox and to actors Freddie Fox, Laurence Fox and Jack Fox.

Samson Fox in popular culture
Fox was the subject of the play, The Man who Captured Sunlight, created by Harrogate Dramatic Society and historian Malcolm Neesam, and premiered in 2022 in memory of Neesam.

References

1838 births
1903 deaths
Chevaliers of the Légion d'honneur
Engineers from Bradford
English industrialists
English inventors
English justices of the peace
English philanthropists
Mayors of Harrogate
People associated with the Royal College of Music
Robin Fox family
19th-century British philanthropists
19th-century English businesspeople